Prishtina Bus Station is the main bus station in Prishtina, Kosovo, 2 km south-west of the city, near Bill Clinton Boulevard. Prishtina bus station is composed by a bus depot and bus terminals, responsible to provides transport to the rest of Kosovo and continental destinations.

History
The Pristina Bus Station was established in 1977 by the municipal government, but construction did not begin until 1982. Completed in 1983, it was administered by the Kosovo Trust Agency from the Kosovo War until 2015, when the municipality took back control.

Buses

Interurban buses

International buses

See also 
 Transport in Kosovo
 Transport in Prishtina
 Fushë Kosova railway station
 Prishtina International Airport

References

External links 
 
 Prishtina Bus Station (Official website)   

Transport in Kosovo
Buildings and structures in Pristina
Bus stations in Europe
Bus stations in Kosovo